Skirts is a 1921 American silent comedy film directed by Hampton Del Ruth and starring Clyde Cook, Chester Conklin, Polly Moran, Jack Cooper, Billy Armstrong, and Ethel Teare. The film was released by Fox Film Corporation on April 10, 1921.

Cast

Preservation
The film is now considered lost.

See also
1937 Fox vault fire

References

External links

1921 comedy films
Fox Film films
Silent American comedy films
1921 films
American silent feature films
American black-and-white films
Lost American films
1921 lost films
Lost comedy films
Films directed by Hampton Del Ruth
1920s American films